Tianzhou 2 was a mission of the Tianzhou-class unmanned cargo spacecraft. The launch took place at 29 May 2021, 12:55:29 UTC. The spacecraft successfully docked with the Tiangong space station later on the same day.

Mission profile 
Tianzhou 2 is a part of the construction of the Tiangong space station, and is the first cargo resupply mission to the already launched Tianhe core module (CCM).  The spacecraft remained docked to the aft docking port of Tianhe until the concurrent manned mission Shenzhou 12 deorbited in September, after which it was moved to the forward docking port. It will then conduct propellant transfer testing with Tianhe and serve as a test unit for Tianhe's robotic arm to manipulate modules as part of space station construction. It undocked on 27 March 2022, did a 2-hour fast rendezvous on 30 March 2022 and burned up in the Earth's atmosphere as planned on re-entry on 31 March 2022.

During its time in space, Tianzhou 2 conducted multiple teleoperated and autonomous rendezvous tests.

Spacecraft 

The Tianzhou cargo spacecraft has several notable differences with the Tiangong-1 from which it is derived. It has only three segments of solar panels (against 4 for Tiangong), but has 4 maneuvering engines (against 2 for Tiangong).

References 

Tiangong program
Tianzhou (spacecraft)
2021 in China
Spacecraft launched in 2021